Ayva can refer to:

 Ayva, Dodurga
 Ayva, İnebolu